The 2019 NCAA Division I Softball season, play of college softball in the United States organized by the National Collegiate Athletic Association (NCAA) at the Division I level, began February 7, 2019. The season will progress through the regular season, many conference tournaments and championship series, and will conclude with the 2019 NCAA Division I softball tournament and 2019 Women's College World Series. The Women's College World Series, consisting of the eight remaining teams in the NCAA Tournament will be held annually in Oklahoma City, Oklahoma at ASA Hall of Fame Stadium, will end in June 2019.

Realignment and format changes
 Liberty, after 27 seasons in the Big South Conference, joined the Atlantic Sun Conference (ASUN) on July 1, 2018.
 USC Upstate, after 11 years in the ASUN, moved to the Big South.

Ballpark Changes
The 2019 season will be the last for the Virginia team at The Park. The team will move to the new University of Virginia Softball Stadium in 2020.

Season outlook

Conference standings

Conference winners and tournaments
Of the 31 Division I athletic conferences that sponsor baseball, 27 end their regular seasons with a single-elimination tournament or a double elimination tournament. The teams in each conference that win their regular season title are given the number one seed in each tournament. Four conferences, the Big West, Mountain West, Pac-12, and West Coast Conference do not hold a conference tournament. The winners of these tournaments, plus the Big West, Mountain West, Pac-12, and West Coast Conference regular-season champions, receive automatic invitations to the 2019 NCAA Division I softball tournament.

National Invitational Softball Championship

UTA Mavericks defeated the Iowa State Cyclones in the championship; Aileen Garcia was named MVP for the series.

Women's College World Series

Participants 

† = From NCAA Division I Softball Championship Results

Bracket
The 2019 Women's College World Series will begin on May 30 in Oklahoma City, Oklahoma.

Season leaders
Batting
Batting average: .507 – Courtney Cashman, UMass Lowell River Hawks
RBIs: 84 – Bailey Hemphill, Alabama Crimson Tide
Home runs: 29 – Jessie Harper, Arizona Wildcats

Pitching
Wins: 39-6 – Summer Ellyson, Louisiana Ragin' Cajuns
ERA: 1.03 (30 ER/203.2 IP) – Brooke Yanez, UC Davis Aggies
Strikeouts: 423 – Nicole Newman, Drake Bulldogs

Records
NCAA Division I season perfect games:
5 – Nicole Newman, Drake Bulldogs

Freshman class single game strikeouts:
27 – Kelly Nelson, Holy Cross Crusaders; March 6, 2019 (16 innings)

Team consecutive wins streak:
41 – Oklahoma Sooners; February 24-May 19, 2019

Awards and honors
USA Softball Collegiate Player of the Year: 
Rachel Garcia, UCLA Bruins

Collegiate Woman Athlete of the Year Honda Sports Award Softball: 
Rachel Garcia, UCLA Bruins

Honda Sports Award Softball: 
Rachel Garcia, UCLA Bruins

NFCA National Pitcher of the Year: 
Rachel Garcia, UCLA Bruins

espnW Softball Player of the Year: 
Rachel Garcia, UCLA Bruins

Softball America Player of the Year: 
Rachel Garcia, UCLA Bruins

NFCA National Player of the Year: 
Abbey Cheek, Kentucky

Softball America Pitcher of the Year: 
Giselle Juarez, Oklahoma Sooners

NFCA National Freshman of the Year: 
Danielle Williams, Northwestern Wildcats
Softball America Freshman of the Year
Danielle Williams, Northwestern Wildcats

Softball America Freshman Pitcher of the Year: Shealyn O'Leary, Texas

NFCA Catcher of the Year: Dejah Mulipola, Arizona

NFCA Golden Shoe Award: Jaquelyn Ramon, Southeastern Louisiana

Senior CLASS Award: Katie Reed, Kentucky

Coaches
NFCA National Coaching Staff of the Year: UCLA
NFCA West Regional Coaching Staff of the Year: UCLA
NFCA Central Regional Coaching Staff of the Year: Oklahoma
NFCA Great Lakes Regional Coaching Staff of the Year: Minnesota
NFCA Mid-Atlantic  Regional Coaching Staff of the Year: Virginia Tech
NFCA Mideast Regional Coaching Staff of the Year: Louisiana Tech & Southeast Missouri State
NFCA Midwest Regional Coaching Staff of the Year: Oklahoma State
NFCA Northeast Regional Coaching Staff of the Year: James Madison
NFCA Pacific Regional Coaching Staff of the Year: Washington
NFCA South Regional Coaching Staff of the Year: Alabama
NFCA Southeast Regional Coaching Staff of the Year: Florida

Assistants
NFCA Assistant Coach of the Year: Sara Michalowski-Marino, Missouri

Other Awards
Turface Athletics/NFCA Field of the Year: Jane Sanders Stadium, Oregon
Donna Newberry "Perseverance" Award: Bari Mance
Humanitarian Award: Joelle Della Volpe, St. Mary's High School (NJ)
Distinguished Service Award:

All America Teams
The following players were members of the All-American Teams.

First Team

Second Team

Third Team

Final rankings

Coaching changes
This table lists programs that changed head coaches at any point from the first day of the 2019 season until the day before the first day of the 2020 season.

See also

2019 NCAA Division I baseball season

References